Semion Lvovich Abugov (30 December 1877 in Byerazino, Minsk Governorate – 3 May 1950 in Leningrad) was a Russian Empire and Soviet painter and art educator, who lived and worked in Leningrad, a member of the Leningrad Union of Artists, professor of the Repin Institute of Arts, regarded as one of the leading art educator of the Leningrad school of painting,

Biography 
Semion Abugov was born on 30 December 1877 in Byerazino village, Minsk Governorate (now Minsk Region, Belarus). In 1900 he graduated from the Odessa Drawing School. Then studied in Saint Petersburg at the Imperial Academy of Arts from Dmitry Kardovsky and Vladimir Makovsky. In 1908 he graduated from Academy of Arts with the title of the artist of painting. His graduate work was a picture named «Motherhood».

Semion Abugov participated in Art Exhibitions since 1908. He painted mainly portraits and landscapes. In 1918 Abugov participated in the design of Petrograd to the first anniversary of the October Revolution. Since 1920 Abugov primarily engaged in Art teaching, at first in Art Schools and studios of Leningrad, then from 1932 at the Leningrad Institute of Painting, Sculpture and Architecture at the All-Russian Academy of Arts. He was professor of painting since 1939.

Semion Abugov died on 3 May 1950 at the age of 72. He was buried in a Transfiguration Jewish cemetery in Leningrad.

Pupils 
 Alexander Debler
 Sergei Osipov
 Vecheslav Zagonek
 Evgenia Baykova
 Victor Teterin
 Evgenia Antipova
 Nikolai Mukho
 Nina Veselova
 Mikhail Natarevich
 Tatiana Kopnina
 Maria Rudnitskaya
 Boris Korneev
 Alexei Eriomin
 Vladimir Chekalov
 Elena Skuin
 Yuri Tulin
 Marina Kozlovskaya
 Elena Kostenko
 Alexander Koroviakov
 Lev Orekhov
 Abram Grushko
 Sergei Babkov
 Natan Voronov
 and a lot of others.

See also

 Fine Art of Leningrad
 Leningrad School of Painting
 List of 20th-century Russian painters
 List of painters of Saint Petersburg Union of Artists
 Saint Petersburg Union of Artists

References

Sources 
 Художники народов СССР. Биобиблиографический словарь. Т. 1. М., Искусство, 1970. С.33.
 Sergei V. Ivanov. Unknown Socialist Realism. The Leningrad School. Saint Petersburg, NP-Print Edition, 2007. P.13, 15, 356, 359, 360, 362, 365, 367-370, 372, 379-381.

1877 births
1950 deaths
People from Berazino
People from Igumensky Uyezd
Belarusian Jews
Members of the Leningrad Union of Artists
Leningrad School artists
Portrait painters from the Russian Empire
Soviet realist painters